This is a non-exhaustive list of films which have portrayed mental disorders.

Inclusion in this list is based upon the disorder as it is portrayed in the canon of the film, and does not necessarily reflect the diagnosis or symptoms in the real world.

Agoraphobia

What About Bob? – 1991 – character of Bob Wiley played by Bill Murray
Copycat - 1995 - character of Helen Hudson played by Sigourney Weaver
The Aviator – 2004 – character of Howard Hughes played by Leonardo DiCaprio

Antisocial personality disorder

(Antisocial Personality Disorder should also include psychopathy and sociopathy.)
Badlands – 1973 – character of Kit Carruthers played by Martin Sheen
One Flew Over the Cuckoo's Nest – 1975 – character of Randle McMurphy played by Jack Nicholson
Wall Street – 1987 – character of Gordon Gekko played by Michael Douglas
The Talented Mr. Ripley – 1999 – character of Tom Ripley played by Matt Damon
Training Day – 2001 – character of Alonzo Harris played by Denzel Washington
Monster – 2003 – character of Aileen "Lee" Wuornos played by Charlize Theron
Nightcrawler – 2014 – character of Louis Bloom played by Jake Gyllenhaal
The Invisible Man – 2020 – character of Adrian Griffin played by Oliver Jackson-Cohen

Attention deficit hyperactivity disorder

Juno – 2007 – character of Juno MacGuff, played by Elliot Page

Avoidant personality disorder
Finding Forrester – 2000 – character of William Forrester played by Sean Connery

Bipolar disorder

Michael Clayton – 2007 – character of Arthur Edens played by Tom Wilkinson

Borderline personality disorder

Mommie Dearest – 1981 – character of Joan Crawford played by Faye Dunaway
Fatal Attraction – 1987 – character of Alex Forrest played by Glenn Close
Basic Instinct – 1992 – character of Catherine Tramell played by Sharon Stone
Single White Female – 1992 – character of Hedra Carlson/Ellen Besch played by Jennifer Jason Leigh
The Crush – 1993 – character of Adrian Forrester played by Alicia Silverstone
Mad Love – 1995 – character of Casey Roberts played by Drew Barrymore
Fear - 1996 - character of David McCall played by Mark Wahlberg
Girl, Interrupted – 1999 – character of Susanna Kaysen played by Winona Ryder
Thirteen – 2003 – character of Evie and Tracy played by Nikki Reed and Evan Rachel Wood respectively.
Notes on a Scandal - 2006 - character of Barbara Covett play by Judi Dench
Obsessed - 2009 - character of Lisa Sheridan played by Ali Larter
Silver Linings Playbook – 2012 – character of Tiffany Maxwell played by Jennifer Lawrence
Welcome to Me – 2014 – character of Alice Klieg played by Kristen Wiig

Conversion disorder

Tommy – 1975 – character of Tommy played by Roger Daltrey

Dependent personality disorder
What About Bob? – 1991 – character of Bob Wiley played by Bill Murray

Dissociative identity disorder

Manichitrathazhu - 1993 -character of Ganga played by Shobana 

Split - 2016 - character of Kevin Wendell Crumb played James McAvoy

Folie à deux (shared psychotic disorder)

Dead Ringers – 1988 – characters of Beverly and Elliot Mantle played by Jeremy Irons
Bug (2006) – characters of Agnes White played by Ashley Judd and Peter Evans played by Michael Shannon

Kleptomania

Häxan
Klepto 
De Dhakka - 2008 - character played of Dhana played by Siddhartha Jadhav

Narcissistic personality disorder
Terms of Endearment – 1983 – character of Aurora Greenway played by Shirley MacLaine

Obsessive–compulsive disorder
Aham - 1992 - character of Sidharthan played by Mohanlal
As Good as It Gets – 1997 – character of Melvin Udall played by Jack Nicholson
The Aviator – 2004 – character of Howard Hughes played by Leonardo DiCaprio
North 24 Kaatham - 2013 - character of Harikrishnan played by Fahadh Faasil
Nitham Oru Vaanam - 2022 - character played by Ashok Selvan

Obsessive–compulsive personality disorder
The Odd Couple – 1968 – character of Felix Ungar played by Jack Lemmon

Paranoid personality disorder
The Caine Mutiny – 1954 – character of Philip Francis Queeg played by Humphrey Bogart

Post-traumatic stress disorder 

The Perks of Being a Wallflower – 2012 – character of Charlie Kelmeckis played by Logan Lerman
Iron Man 3 – 2013 – character of Tony Stark played by Robert Downey Jr.

Schizoaffective disorder

Terminator 2: Judgment Day – 1991 – character of Sarah Connor played by Linda Hamilton

Schizoid personality disorder

The Remains of the Day – 1993 – character of Mr James Stevens played by Anthony Hopkins
The Lord of the Rings: The Two Towers – 2002 – character of Gollum
The Lord of the Rings: The Return of the King – 2003 – character of Gollum
Lars and the Real Girl – 2007 – Lars Lindstrom
The Hobbit: An Unexpected Journey – 2012 – character of Gollum

Schizotypal personality disorder
Taxi Driver – 1976 – character of Travis Bickle played by Robert De Niro
Charlie and the Chocolate Factory – 2005 – character of Willy Wonka played by Johnny Depp

Schizophrenia

A Beautiful Mind – 2001 – character of John F. Nash played by Russell Crowe
Donnie Darko – 2001 – character of Donnie Darko played by Jake Gyllenhaal
The Voices – 2014 – character of Jerry Hickfang played by Ryan Reynolds
Words on Bathroom Walls – 2020 – Character of Adam Petrazelli played by Charlie Plummer

Stuttering

One Flew Over the Cuckoo's Nest - 1975 - character of Billy Bibbit played by Brad Dourif
The King's Speech – 2010 – character of King George VI played by Colin Firth 
Golmaal 3 - 2010 - character of Laxman played by Shreyas Talpade
IT – 2017 – character of Bill Denbrough played by Jaeden Martell

Substance use disorder 

"Drugs listed from most addictive, harmful or destructive to least (from most to least dangerous, based on a 2007 scientific research study." 
Colossal – 2016 – character of Gloria played by Anne Hathaway

See also
 Mental disorders in fiction

Notes

References
 Danny Wedding, Mary Ann Boyd and Ryan M. Niemiec, Movies and Mental Illness: Using Films to Understand Psychopathology, 2nd ed., Cambridge, MA, Hogrefe & Hufer Publishing, 2005, . Movies and Mental Illness – Hogrefe Publishing
 David J. Robinson, Reel Psychiatry: Movie Portrayals of Psychiatric Conditions, Rapid Psychler Press, 2003, .
 Glen O. Gabbard and Krin Gabbard, Psychiatry and the Cinema, American Psychiatric Publishing, Inc., 2nd ed., 1999, .
 Otto F. Wahl, Media Madness: Public Images of Mental Illness, Piscataway, NJ, Rutgers University Press, 1997, .

Lists of films